The Scribbler's Retreat Writer's Conference is a writers' conference held four times a year in St. Simons Island, Georgia. Scribblers' Retreat encourages, educates, and promotes new and published authors of all ages to continue to write and publish their works.

History
Scribblers' Retreat Writers' Conference is a non-profit organization and was founded in January 2009

The organization that supports the advancement of writers, published and non-published.  They offer four sessions of specifically chosen genres throughout the year to provide conference attendees a symposium of experienced teachers, writers, editors, and others from the publishing world.

Authors
Noted authors who have been speakers at the conferences include:

 Diana Gabaldon
 Karen White
 Adam Davies
 Steve Berry
 Jack McDevitt
 Lois Ruby

See also
 List of writers' conferences

External links 
Scribblers' Retreat Writers' Conference
Georgia Writers Association
Newspages.com Writers Conferences

References 

American writers' organizations
Recurring events established in 2009
Writers' conferences
Literary festivals in the United States
Events in Georgia (U.S. state)
St. Simons, Georgia